was an old province of Japan that is now the western half of Kagoshima Prefecture on the island of Kyūshū.

History

Satsuma's provincial capital was Satsumasendai. During the Sengoku period, Satsuma was a fief of the Shimazu daimyō, who ruled much of southern Kyūshū from their castle at Kagoshima city. They were the initial patrons of Satsuma ware, which was later widely exported to the West.

In 1871, with the abolition of feudal domains and the establishment of prefectures after the Meiji Restoration, the provinces of Satsuma and Ōsumi were combined to eventually establish Kagoshima Prefecture.

Satsuma was one of the main provinces that rose in opposition to the Tokugawa shogunate in the mid 19th century. Because of this, the oligarchy that came into power after the Meiji Restoration of 1868 had a strong representation from the Satsuma province, with leaders such as Ōkubo Toshimichi and Saigō Takamori taking up key government positions.

Satsuma is well known for its production of sweet potatoes, known in Japan as 薩摩芋 (Satsuma-Imo or "Satsuma potato"). Satsuma mandarins (known as mikan in Japan) do not specifically originate from Satsuma but were imported into the West through this province in the Meiji era.

Historical districts
 Kagoshima Prefecture
 Ata District (阿多郡) - merged into Hioki District on March 29, 1896
 Ei District (頴娃郡) - merged into Ibusuki District (along with parts of Kiire District) on March 29, 1896
 Hioki District (日置郡) - absorbed Ata District on March 29, 1896; now dissolved
 Ibusuki District (揖宿郡) - absorbed Ei and parts of Kiire Districts on March 29, 1896; now dissolved
 Isa District (囎唹郡)
 Kitaisa District (北伊佐郡) - merged with Hishikari District (菱刈郡) of Ōsumi Province to become the 2nd incarnation of Isa District (伊佐郡) on March 29, 1896
 Minamiisa District (東囎唹郡) - merged into Satsuma District (along with Koshikijima and Taki Districts) on March 29, 1896
 Izaku District (伊作郡) - merged into Ata District prior the Meiji period
 Izumi District (出水郡)
 Kagoshima District (鹿児島郡) - absorbed Kitaōsumi District (北大隅郡) of Ōsumi Province and Taniyama District of Satsuma Province on March 29, 1896
 Kawanabe District (川辺郡) - absorbed remaining parts of Kiire District (the village of Chiran) on March 29, 1896; now dissolved
 Koshikijima District (甑島郡) - merged into Satsuma District (along with Minamiisa and Taki Districts) on March 29, 1896
 Kiire District (給黎郡) - split and merged into Kawanabe and Ibusuki Districts on March 29, 1896
 Satsuma District (薩摩郡) - absorbed Koshikijima, Minamiisa and Taki Districts on March 29, 1896
 Taki District (高城郡) - merged into Satsuma District (along with Koshikijima and Minamiisa Districts) on March 29, 1896
 Taniyama District (谿山郡) - merged into Kagoshima District (along with Kitaōsumi District of Ōsumi Province) on March 29, 1896

See also
 Shimazu clan
 Satsuma Domain
 Japanese battleship Satsuma
 History of Kagoshima Prefecture

Notes

References
 Nussbaum, Louis-Frédéric and Käthe Roth. (2005).  Japan encyclopedia. Cambridge: Harvard University Press. ;

External links 

  Murdoch's map of provinces, 1903

 
Former provinces of Japan